The sooty babbler (Stachyris herberti) is a species of bird in the family Timaliidae. It is found in Laos and Vietnam. Its natural habitat is subtropical or tropical moist lowland forest. It is threatened by habitat loss.

References

Collar, N. J. & Robson, C. 2007. Family Timaliidae (Babblers)  pp. 70 – 291 in; del Hoyo, J., Elliott, A. & Christie, D.A. eds. Handbook of the Birds of the World, Vol. 12. Picathartes to Tits and Chickadees. Lynx Edicions, Barcelona.

sooty babbler
Birds of Laos
Birds of Vietnam
sooty babbler
sooty babbler
Taxonomy articles created by Polbot